Agalagama is a village in Belihuloya, Sri Lanka.

Populated places in Sabaragamuwa Province